Collier Row F.C. was an English association football club  that was formed in 1962. The club were founding members of the Essex Olympian League. From the 1981–82 season until the 1985–86 season the club competed in the London Spartan League before joining the Isthmian League for the 1986–87 season. They competed in the Isthmian League for ten seasons, the highest position achieved being in 1988–89 when they finished 19th (out of 21) in the First Division. Prior to the 1996–97 season the club merged with Romford to form Collier Row & Romford.

References

Association football clubs established in 1923
1923 establishments in England
Parthenon League
Isthmian League
Defunct football clubs in England
Defunct football clubs in London
Spartan League
Association football clubs disestablished in 1996
Sport in the London Borough of Havering